Brenda Morehead (born October 5, 1957) is an American sprinter. 

Morehead ran for Toledo Scott High School; where she participated in the first girls high school meet, winning four events and leading her team to victory. She competed in the women's 100 metres at the 1976 Summer Olympics. Morehead qualified for the 1980 U.S. Olympic team but was unable to compete due to the 1980 Summer Olympics boycott. She did however receive one of 461 Congressional Gold Medals created especially for the spurned athletes.

References

External links
 

1957 births
Living people
Athletes (track and field) at the 1976 Summer Olympics
American female sprinters
Olympic track and field athletes of the United States
Sportspeople from Monroe, Louisiana
Tennessee State Lady Tigers track and field athletes
Congressional Gold Medal recipients
Athletes (track and field) at the 1975 Pan American Games
Athletes (track and field) at the 1979 Pan American Games
Track and field athletes from Louisiana
Pan American Games gold medalists for the United States
Pan American Games silver medalists for the United States
Pan American Games medalists in athletics (track and field)
USA Outdoor Track and Field Championships winners
USA Indoor Track and Field Championships winners
Medalists at the 1975 Pan American Games
Medalists at the 1979 Pan American Games
Olympic female sprinters